Śnietnica  (Snitnytsia) is a village in the administrative district of Gmina Uście Gorlickie, within Gorlice County, Lesser Poland Voivodeship, in southern Poland, close to the border with Slovakia.

References

Villages in Gorlice County